Lance Dreher is a two-time Mr. Universe and former Mr. America. Dreher was born in Chicago, Illinois, on June 27, 1955.  Dreher has placed in the top 3 of 10 professional body building championships. One of Lance's greatest body building features is his 23.5 inch biceps.  After his last competition in 1992, Lance completed his PhD in Nutritional Counseling, is a certified life coach and National Fitness Hall of Fame Inductee 2019.  

Lance currently hosts a radio talkshow on KFYI called "Fitness Talk w/ Lance Dreher"

Competitions
Below is a list of all Competitions Lance has participated in:

Magazine Appearances

References 

1955 births
American bodybuilders
Professional bodybuilders
Living people
Life coaches